This is a list of VTV dramas released in 2023.
 
←2022 – 2023 – 2024→

VTV1 Weeknight Prime-time dramas 
These dramas air from 21:00 to 21:30, Monday to Friday on VTV1.

VTV3 Weeknight Prime-time dramas

First line-up 
These dramas air from 20:00 to 20:30, Monday to Friday on VTV3.

Second line-up

Monday-Wednesday dramas 
These dramas air from 21:40 to 22:30, Monday to Wednesday on VTV3.

Thursday-Friday dramas 
These dramas air from 21:40 to 22:30, Thursday and Friday on VTV3.

See also 

 List of dramas broadcast by Vietnam Television (VTV)
 List of dramas broadcast by Hanoi Radio Television (HanoiTV)
 List of dramas broadcast by Vietnam Digital Television (VTC)
 List of television programmes broadcast by Vietnam Television (VTV)

References

External links 
VTV.gov.vn – Official VTV Website 
VTV.vn – Official VTV Online Newspaper 

Vietnam Television original programming
2023 in Vietnamese television